Havana Air is an internet booking engine travel website offering scheduled charter services from Miami, Florida and Tampa, Florida to Cuba. The company was founded in the United States in 2014, and specializes in tourism to Cuba from the United States.

Destinations
Havana Air previously served several cities in Cuba. From March 2020, the US government restricted flights from the US to Havana only.

Fleet
As of August 2016, Havana Air doesn't operate any aircraft. It formerly utilized a chartered Boeing 737-400. 

The airline previously contracted with Eastern Air Lines (2015), and now primarily contracts with IAero Airways for its flights.

References

Airlines of the United States
Airlines established in 2014
Charter airlines